Sora Shirai (白井空良, Shirai Sora, born 3 November 2001) is a Japanese professional skateboarder who lives and skates in Kanagawa, Japan. In 2019, at the age of 17, Shirai released his first full length professional skateboarding skate part in the Blind Skateboards video Time Change.

Skateboarding career

Skate video parts 
 2019: Time Change - Blind

Competitions

2019
Damn Am Japan: 1st
Skate Ark Japan: 1st
Dew Tour - Long Beach (street): 2nd
X Games Minneapolis (street): 3rd

References

2001 births
Living people
Japanese skateboarders
Olympic skateboarders of Japan
Skateboarders at the 2020 Summer Olympics
X Games athletes
Sportspeople from Kanagawa Prefecture
People from Sagamihara
World Skateboarding Championship medalists
21st-century Japanese people